Nada, which means "nothing" in Spanish, is the first novel of Spanish author Carmen Laforet, published in 1945.

Plot
The novel is set in post Spanish Civil War Barcelona. The novel is narrated by its main character, Andrea, an orphan, who has fond memories of her well off family in Barcelona, and has been raised in a convent in provincial Spain.

The government has awarded Andrea a scholarship and a subsistence stipend so that she can attend university. She travels to Barcelona to the home of her grandmother, only to find it filthy and falling apart. Her frail, devoutly Catholic grandmother seems unaware of her miserable surroundings. Also living in the crumbling house is a strict, controlling aunt Angustias, a roguish, but musically talented uncle, Roman, another uncle, Juan, who abuses his beautiful wife Gloria. The whole group regularly comes to blows throughout Andrea’s stay, and Angustias eventually escapes by entering a convent.

At the university, Andrea befriends a rich girl, Ena, who begins a strange relationship with Andrea's Uncle Roman. She pretends to care for him, but is really taking revenge for his poor treatment of her mother years before.

Roman becomes involved in the black market, but Gloria reports him to the authorities. He commits suicide, in fear of arrest by the Francoist police.

Ena and her family move to Madrid, and soon send for Andrea to join them.  Ena’s father offers to give her a job and subsidize her further education. In the final part of the novel, Andrea is picked up by the family’s fancy car and she leaves behind her unpleasant life on Aribau Street in Barcelona.

Reception
Nada was published in 1945 when LaForet was 23 and created a "sensation" in Barcelona when it came out. Nada won Laforet the first Premio Nadal literary prize in Spain.

This book passed the censorship of the Francoist State and so it ignores the harshness of the government at the time. Since the Francoist State was suppressing the Catalan language and Catalan culture in Barcelona, the novel hardly mentions either. However, the book became very popular when it finally cleared Franco’s censors. It is considered to be an important contribution to the school of Existentialist literature of post-Civil War Spain.

In 2007 an English translation of Nada was published.

Fernández-Lamarque and Fernández-Babineaux see metatextual references with Little Red Riding Hood and gender inversion in the novel depicting Andrea and Ena as androgynous beings.

References 

1945 novels
Existentialist novels
Novels set in Barcelona
20th-century Spanish novels
Spanish novels adapted into films